Rhinotermitidae is a family of wood-soil interface feeding termites commonly known as the subterranean termites. Many members of this family are known pests which can cause extensive damage to buildings or other wooden structures. Most species establish colonies in wood before migrating to the ground to create diffuse nests connecting to multiple pieces of wood, with some taxa such as Coptotermitinae creating mounds or centralized carton nests within wood. All members forage via shelter tubes through the soil to sources of food. In addition, Rhinotermitidae are known for having a higher level of social complexity as compared to other termites. Communication takes place through chemical activity, more specifically through traces of cuticular hydrocarbon (CHC), or semiochemicals, acting as pheromones to send signals to the king and queen of the nest (Anne-Geneviève Bagnères; Edward Vargo, 2019). About 345 species are recognized, among these are severe pests such as Coptotermes formosanus, Coptotermes gestroi, and Reticulitermes flavipes.

Subfamilies and Genera
WikiSpecies and the Termite Catalogue list the following:
Coptotermitinae
Auth.:  Holmgren, 1910 
 CoptotermesHeterotermitinae
Auth.:  Froggatt, 1897 (synonym Leucotermitinae Holmgren, 1910a)
 Heterotermes Reticulitermes TsaitermesProrhinotermitinae
Auth.:  Quennedey & Deligne, 1975
 ProrhinotermesPsammotermitinae
Auth.:  Holmgren, 1911 (Note: Holmgren included this taxon in "family Mesotermitidae")
 PsammotermesRhinotermitinae
Auth.:  Froggatt, 1897
 Acorhinotermes Dolichorhinotermes Macrorhinotermes Parrhinotermes Rhinotermes SchedorhinotermesTermitogetoninae
Auth.: Holmgren, 1910
 Termitogetonincertae sedis
 †Zophotermes''

References 

Anne-Geneviève Bagnères, Edward Vargo. Subterranean Termites (Rhinotermitidae). Encyclopedia
of Social Insects, Springer International Publishing, pp.1-5, 2019, ff10.1007/978-3-319-90306-4_120-1ff.
ffhal-02383262f

External links 
 
 

Termites
Blattodea families